Mokra Gora (is a mountain on the border between Serbia, Kosovo and Montenegro. It is part of the Accursed Mountains range. The Pogled peak is shared between Serbia and Kosovo, while Beleg is on the tripoint. The peak Berim is also part of this mountain. In Kosovo, the town of Istog lies just south of the mountain on the Metohija plain, which borders the mountain to the south.

Notes and references

Notes:

References:

Accursed Mountains
Two-thousanders of Kosovo
Two-thousanders of Montenegro